Life's Work is an American sitcom series that aired from September 1996 to June 1997 on ABC; the show stars Lisa Ann Walter as Lisa Ann Minardi Hunter, an assistant district attorney in Baltimore.

Lisa Ann always wanted to practice law since she was young because she always argued with her parents. She also had a basketball coach husband named Kevin Hunter (Michael O'Keefe) who served as the patriarch of the family. Together, they raised a seven-year-old daughter Tess (Alexa Vega) and a toddler son named Griffin (Cameron and Luca Weibel). During the entire run of the series, an electric guitar & piano instrumental was used as the show's opening theme. Walter helped Mark Mothersbaugh write the theme.

Lisa Ann Walter was an actress turned stand-up comic whose "voice" of a busy working mom became a top headlining act in the 1990s. The offer from ABC developed into Life's Work, where Walter played a feisty feminist who could stand up to her mother in addition to her superiors at work. Walter received almost unanimous positive reviews for her portrayal of a harried working mother in a bold departure from the usual working mom shows where you never see the mom actually working.

As of July 2022, 15 (of the 18) episodes are available to purchase on several streaming services including AppleTV, Amazon, and YouTube.

In one of the episodes, Lisa Ann claimed to have a sexual affair with then-current American President Bill Clinton.

Cast

Main
 Michael O'Keefe as Kevin Hunter
 Lisa Ann Walter as Lisa Ann Minardi Hunter 
 Alexa Vega as Tess Hunter
 Cameron and Luca Weibel as Griffin Hunter

Recurring
 Larry Miller as Mr. Jerome Nash
 Lightfield Lewis as Matt Youngster
 Molly Hagan as Dee Dee Lucas
 Jenny O'Hara and Lainie Kazan as Constance "Connie" Minardi
 Tara Karsian as Emily

Episodes

Cancellation
The show was put on hiatus after the episode "Neighbors" aired on January 27, 1997. Months later, the show was officially cancelled even though it earned higher ratings than The Drew Carey Show and held on to 90% of the viewers who watched the final season of Roseanne.

References

Bibliography

1990s American sitcoms
1996 American television series debuts
1997 American television series endings
1990s American legal television series
1990s American workplace comedy television series
American Broadcasting Company original programming
English-language television shows
Television series by ABC Studios
Television shows set in Baltimore